Prospertown is an unincorporated community located within the New Jersey townships of Jackson and Plumsted in Ocean County and Upper Freehold in Monmouth County. The community is home to Prospertown Lake and is adjacent to Six Flags Great Adventure, both located on County Route 537 (Monmouth Road). The center of the community is located at the intersection of CR 537, Hawkin Road (CR 640 on the Ocean County side of CR 537), and Emleys Hill Road (on the Monmouth County side). Most of the area consists of pine forests (as the area is located in the northern reaches of the Pine Barrens) but there are some homes along the roads in the area.

Prospertown was once a settlement, consisting of a hotel, several homes, and a gristmill.

References

Jackson Township, New Jersey
Plumsted Township, New Jersey
Upper Freehold Township, New Jersey
Populated places in the Pine Barrens (New Jersey)
Unincorporated communities in Monmouth County, New Jersey
Unincorporated communities in Ocean County, New Jersey
Unincorporated communities in New Jersey